Wu Pai-ho (born November 29, 1987) is a Taiwanese football player.  He received the "Golden Shoe" award in the Highschool Football League 2006 season.

Playing history
 Taipei County Ching Shui Senior High School
 National Pei Men Senior High School
 Fu Jen Catholic University

Career Honours
Individual Honours
 Highschool Football League 2006 Golden Shoe

International goals

References

1987 births
Living people
Fu Jen Catholic University alumni
Taiwanese footballers
Chinese Taipei international footballers
Association football defenders